Cristian Alberto Pellerano (born 1 February 1982) is an Argentine professional footballer who plays as a midfielder for  Independiente del Valle. He is a Mexican naturalized citizen.

His younger brother Hernán is also a professional footballer.

Career
Pellerano started his playing career in 2001 with Club Atlético Atlanta in the lower leagues of Argentine football, playing in 113 matches and scoring 17 goals. In 2005, he joined  Defensores de Belgrano of the Primera B Nacional for the Apertura. Later that year he joined Nueva Chicago, helping the club to win promotion to the Primera División.

In 2007 Pellerano was signed by Racing Club, where he established himself as a regular member of the first team squad, making 24 appearances in his year with the club.

Pellerano joined Arsenal de Sarandí in 2008. He scored his first league goal for the club on 25 April 2009 on his 43rd appearance in a game against San Martín de Tucumán.

During the winter transfer window, Pellerano joined Colón de Santa Fe. On 9 June 2010 Independiente signed him on a free transfer.

On 15 July 2012, Pellerano was sold to Mexican Liga MX side Club Tijuana.

On December 15, 2014, Pellerano was transferred to Club America.

Honours

Club
Independiente
Copa Sudamericana: 2010

Tijuana 
Liga MX: Apertura 2012

América
CONCACAF Champions League: 2014–15

Independiente del Valle
Copa Sudamericana: 2019
Copa Sudamericana: 2022
Copa Ecuador: 2022
Supercopa de Ecuador: 2023
Recopa Sudamericana: 2023

References

External links
 
 Argentine Primera statistics at Fútbol XXI  
 

1982 births
Living people
Footballers from Buenos Aires
Argentine footballers
Association football midfielders
Club Atlético Atlanta footballers
Defensores de Belgrano footballers
Nueva Chicago footballers
Racing Club de Avellaneda footballers
Arsenal de Sarandí footballers
Club Atlético Colón footballers
Club Atlético Independiente footballers
Club Tijuana footballers
Club América footballers
Atlético Morelia players
C.D. Veracruz footballers
C.S.D. Independiente del Valle footballers
Argentine Primera División players
Primera Nacional players
Liga MX players
Expatriate footballers in Mexico
Expatriate footballers in Ecuador
Naturalized citizens of Mexico